Dallas Reef, also known as ; ; Mandarin ; Rajah Matanda Reef, lies on the SW extremity of Dangerous Ground (South China Sea) in the Spratly Islands of the South China Sea.

It is approximately 7 km long and 2 km wide, and encloses a lagoon ~15m deep.  It is 9 km west of Ardasier Reef, and 26 km north of Swallow Reef.
 
As with all of the Spratly Islands, the ownership of the atoll is disputed. It is controlled by Malaysia, and claimed by the People's Republic of China, the Republic of China (Taiwan) and Vietnam. The Filipino(Tagalog) name is named after precolonial Philippine ruler of Rajahnate of Maynila, Rajah Matanda.

References

Reefs of the Spratly Islands